Martin Ingram is the pseudonym of ex-British Army soldier Ian Hurst, who served in the Intelligence Corps and Force Research Unit (FRU). He has made a number of allegations about the conduct of the British Army, its operations in Northern Ireland via the FRU, and against figures in the Provisional Irish Republican Army (IRA) and Sinn Féin.

See also
Stakeknife
Freddie Scappaticci
Force Research Unit
British Military Intelligence Systems in Northern Ireland
 Phone hacking scandal reference lists
 Metropolitan police role in phone hacking scandal

References

External links
 Summary of the allegations against McGuinness prior to the Sunday World story available here.
Lengthy Interview given by Martin Ingram on Radio Free Eireann describing his FRU activities. NOTE, the interview begins twenty-five minutes in.
 British Irish Rights Watch Report on "Stakeknife"

Intelligence Corps soldiers
Living people
Year of birth missing (living people)
People of The Troubles (Northern Ireland)